Eric Hass (March 4, 1905 – October 2, 1980) was a four-time Socialist Labor candidate for President of the United States.

Life
Hass was of German and Danish ancestry, and was born in Lincoln, Nebraska in 1905. He died of a heart attack in Community Hospital, Santa Rosa, California on October 2, 1980.

State elections
In 1942, he ran for New York State Attorney General.

In 1944, he ran for U.S. Senator from New York.

In 1950, 1958 and 1962, he ran for Governor of New York.

Presidential elections
In 1952, his running mate was Stephen Emery; in 1956 and 1960, Georgia Cozzini; and in 1964, Henning A. Blomen. He came in third place in 1964.

Hass was also a prolific author on topics dealing with socialism and one of the SLP's more influential members.

Bibliography
 John L. Lewis Exposed (1937)
 The Socialist industrial unionism the workers' power (1941)
 Labor Draft: Step To Industrial Slavery (1943)
 The Americanism of Socialism (1944)
 Stalinist Imperialism: the social and economic forces behind Russian expansion (1946)
 The Socialist Labor Party and the Internationals (1949)
 Dave Beck, labor merchant. The case history of a labor leader (1955)
 Militarism Labor's Foe! (1955)
 What workers should know about automation ...and what employers don't tell them (1957)
 The Reactionary Right: Incipient Fascism (1966)

See also

Georgia Cozzini

External links

  at Nebraska State Historical Society

References

1905 births
1980 deaths
American people of Danish descent
American people of German descent
Socialist Labor Party of America presidential nominees
Candidates in the 1952 United States presidential election
Candidates in the 1956 United States presidential election
Candidates in the 1960 United States presidential election
Candidates in the 1964 United States presidential election
Politicians from Lincoln, Nebraska
Socialist Labor Party of America politicians from New York (state)
20th-century American politicians